Scottellia is a genus of shrubs and trees in the family Achariaceae. Members of this genus are native to the African tropics.

Species 
The following species are currently recognized:

Scottellia klaineana Pierre
Scottellia leonensis Oliv.
Scottellia orientalis Gilg

References 

Achariaceae
Malpighiales genera
Taxa named by Daniel Oliver